Nemanja Bošković (born 8 May 1990) is a Serbian footballer.

External links
 Nemanja Bošković at Srbijafudbal

1990 births
People from West Bačka District
Living people
Serbian footballers
Association football midfielders
FK Hajduk Kula players
FK Crvenka players
FK Radnički Sombor players
FK Mladost Apatin players
FK TSC Bačka Topola players
FK Senta players
FK Proleter Novi Sad players
FK Slavija Sarajevo players
Vasalunds IF players
Serbian SuperLiga players
Serbian First League players
Premier League of Bosnia and Herzegovina players
Division 2 (Swedish football) players
Serbian expatriate footballers
Expatriate footballers in Bosnia and Herzegovina
Serbian expatriate sportspeople in Bosnia and Herzegovina
Expatriate footballers in Sweden
Serbian expatriate sportspeople in Sweden